Pretty Woman is a 1990 American romantic comedy film directed by Garry Marshall, from a screenplay by J. F. Lawton. The film stars Julia Roberts and Richard Gere, and features Héctor Elizondo, Ralph Bellamy (in his final performance), Laura San Giacomo, and Jason Alexander in supporting roles.

The film's story centers on Hollywood prostitute Vivian Ward and wealthy businessman Edward Lewis. Vivian is hired to be Edward's escort for several business and social functions, and their relationship develops during her week-long stay with him.

The film's title Pretty Woman is based on the 1964 song "Oh, Pretty Woman" by Roy Orbison. The original screenplay was titled “3,000”, and was written by then-struggling screenwriter J. F. Lawton. It is the first film on-screen collaboration between Gere and Roberts; their second film, Runaway Bride, was released in 1999.

Originally intended to be a dark cautionary tale about class and prostitution in Los Angeles, the film was re-conceived as a romantic comedy with a large budget. The film received positive reviews, and Roberts received a Golden Globe Award for Best Actress in a Motion Picture – Musical or Comedy and a nomination for the Academy Award for Best Actress for her performance, which catapulted her to superstardom. In addition, screenwriter J. F. Lawton was nominated for a Writers Guild Award and a BAFTA Award. 

The film saw the highest number of ticket sales in the US ever for a romantic comedy, with Box Office Mojo listing it as the number-one romantic comedy by the highest estimated domestic tickets sold at 42,176,400, slightly ahead of My Big Fat Greek Wedding (2002) at 41,419,500 tickets. The film grossed million worldwide and at the time of its release, was the fourth-highest-grossing film of all time worldwide, behind only E.T. the Extra-Terrestrial ( million at the time), Star Wars ($530 million at the time) and Indiana Jones and the Last Crusade ( million at the time).

Plot  
Edward Lewis, a powerful corporate raider hailing from New York, acquires and dismantles struggling companies, selling their assets for profit. He invites his girlfriend, Jessica, to join him on a business trip, but she grows weary of being at his constant beck and call and decides to end their relationship. One night, while leaving a business party in the Hollywood Hills, Edward takes his lawyer's Lotus Esprit sports car and unintentionally finds himself in the city's red-light district on Hollywood Boulevard. It is here where he meets Vivian Ward, a prostitute. Struggling to operate the manual transmission car, Edward pays Vivian to drive him to the Regent Beverly Wilshire Hotel. Impulsively, Edward hires Vivian for the night and, despite initial awkwardness, finds her charming and ultimately has sex with her.

The following day, Edward asks Vivian to pose as his girlfriend during a week-long series of business events he must attend while attempting a takeover of James Morse's shipbuilding company. Edward offers Vivian $3,000 and a new wardrobe for six days. Excitedly, Vivian accepts the offer. However, when she tries to shop on Rodeo Drive, she is turned away by a snobbish and rude saleswoman. She turns to Barney, the hotel's manager, for assistance. He teaches her proper etiquette and helps her purchase a cocktail dress for an important business dinner that evening. During the dinner, Edward introduces Vivian to James and his grandson, David. The latter is being groomed to take over the company after his grandfather passes away. The business meeting does not go well, and James and David are unimpressed by Edward's intentions to purchase and sell their company. Edward takes notice of Vivian's transformation and becomes more open with her. He reveals details about his personal and business life, including his estranged relationship with his late father, Carter, at the time of his death.

When Edward's attorney, Phillip, suspects that Vivian is a corporate spy after seeing her talking to David at a polo game, Edward reveals the true nature of their relationship. However, Phillip later crudely propositions Vivian for her services after Edward is finished with her. Vivian feels hurt and angry that Edward exposed her in that way. Edward apologizes, admitting that he was jealous of Vivian talking to David and acknowledging that her straightforward personality is having a positive effect on him. Edward takes Vivian by private jet to see La traviata at the San Francisco Opera, a story about a prostitute who falls in love with a wealthy man. The story moves Vivian, and she breaks her "no kissing" rule before having sex with Edward. After believing Edward has fallen asleep, Vivian confesses her love for him.

As Edward's return to New York draws near, he offers to help Vivian get off the streets by suggesting that he put her up in a nice condo and provide her with an allowance. He promises to visit her regularly. However, Vivian is offended by the offer, feeling that Edward is still treating her like a prostitute. She recalls a childhood fantasy of being rescued from her abusive home by a knight on a white steed. Edward meets with James, but having been changed by his experience with Vivian, he chooses to work with him to save his company instead of dismantling it. Meanwhile, Phillip is furious that Edward's new direction has cost him a fortune, so he goes to the hotel to confront him. However, he only finds Vivian there. Blaming her for Edward's changing character and angry at his business decision, he attempts to rape her. When Edward arrives, he punches Phillip and fires him for his behavior.

After completing his business in Los Angeles, Edward asks Vivian to stay with him for one more night. However, he makes it clear that she should only do so if she wants to, not because he is paying her. Vivian gently refuses and leaves. This rejection prompts Edward to re-evaluate his life, and while being driven to the airport, he asks the chauffeur to detour to Vivian's apartment building. He climbs out of the white limousine's sunroof and ascends the fire escape to rescue Vivian, just like the knight in her childhood fantasy.

Cast  
 Julia Roberts as Vivian Ward, a free-spirited Hollywood prostitute 
 Richard Gere as Edward Lewis, a rich corporate raider from New York who hires Vivian to be his escort for a week
 Ralph Bellamy as James Morse, owner of Morse Industries, a troubled shipbuilding company Edward plans to take over
 Jason Alexander as Phillip Stuckey, Edward's insensitive lawyer
 Héctor Elizondo as Barnard "Barney" Thompson, the dignified and soft-hearted hotel manager
 Laura San Giacomo as Kit De Luca, Vivian's sarcastic wisecracking best friend and roommate who taught her the prostitution trade
 Alex Hyde-White as David Morse, James Morse's grandson, who is being groomed to take over the Morse's shipbuilding company
 Amy Yasbeck as Elizabeth Stuckey, Phillip's wife
 Elinor Donahue as Bridget, a friend of Barney Thompson who works in a women's clothing store
 John David Carson as Mark Roth, a businessman in Edward's office
 Judith Baldwin as Susan, one of Edward's ex-girlfriends whom he runs into at Phil's party at the beginning of the film. She has recently married and Edward's secretary was a bridesmaid.
 James Patrick Stuart as Dennis, the day bellhop
 Dey Young as a snobbish saleswoman in a clothing store
 Larry Miller as Mr. Hollister, the manager of a clothing store where Vivian buys her new wardrobe
 Hank Azaria as a detective

Production

Development  
The film was initially conceived as a dark drama about prostitution in Los Angeles in the 1980s. The relationship between Vivian and Edward also originally involved controversial themes, including Vivian being addicted to drugs; part of the deal was that she had to stay off cocaine for a week. Edward eventually throws her out of his car and drives off. The original script by J.F.Lawton, called 3000, ended with Vivian and her prostitute friend on the bus to Disneyland. Producer Laura Ziskin considered these elements detrimental to a sympathetic portrayal of Vivian, and they were removed or assigned to Kit. The deleted scenes have been found, and some were included on the DVD released for the film's 15th anniversary. In one, Vivian tells Edward, "I could just pop ya good and be on my way", indicating her lack of interest in "pillow talk". In another, she is confronted by a drug dealer, Carlos, then rescued by Edward when the limo driver Darryl gets his gun out.

Though inspired by such films as Wall Street and The Last Detail, the film bears a resemblance to Pygmalion myths: particularly George Bernard Shaw's play of the same name, which also formed the basis for the Broadway musical My Fair Lady. It was Walt Disney Studios then-president Jeffrey Katzenberg who insisted the film be re-written as a modern-day fairy tale and love story, as opposed to the original dark drama. It was pitched to Touchstone Pictures and re-written as a romantic comedy. The title 3000 was changed because Disney executives thought it sounded like a title for a science fiction film.

Casting  
The casting of the film was a rather lengthy process. Marshall had initially considered Christopher Reeve, Daniel Day-Lewis, Kevin Kline, and Denzel Washington for the role of Edward, and Albert Brooks, Sylvester Stallone, Al Pacino and Burt Reynolds turned it down. Pacino went as far as doing a casting reading with Roberts before rejecting the part. Sam Neill, Tom Conti and Charles Grodin tested for the part along with Roberts.  Christopher Lambert was also considered for the role.  Gere initially refused but when he met with Roberts, she persuaded him and he eventually agreed to play Lewis. He reportedly started off much more active in his role; but Garry Marshall took him aside and said "No, no, no, Richard. In this movie, one of you moves and one of you does not. Guess which one you are?" Julia Roberts was not the first choice for the role of Vivian, and was not wanted by Disney. Many other actresses were considered. Marshall originally envisioned Karen Allen for the role; when she declined, auditions went to many better-known actresses of the time including Molly Ringwald, who turned it down because she felt uncomfortable playing a prostitute. Winona Ryder auditioned, but was turned down because Marshall felt she was "too young". Jennifer Connelly was also dismissed for the same reason. Emily Lloyd turned it down as it conflicted with her shooting for the film Mermaids. Drew Barrymore, Brooke Shields, Uma Thurman, and Kristin Davis auditioned for the role of Vivian.

Meg Ryan, who was a top choice of Marshall's, turned it down as well. According to a note written by Marshall, Mary Steenburgen was also among the first choices. Diane Lane came very close to being cast (the script was much darker at the time); they had gone as far as costume fittings, but due to scheduling conflicts she could not accept. Michelle Pfeiffer turned the role down, saying she did not like the script's "tone." Daryl Hannah was also considered but believed the role was "degrading to women". Valeria Golino declined, doubting it would work with her thick Italian accent. And Jennifer Jason Leigh had auditioned. Lea Thompson unsuccessfully auditioned for the role as she thought the film was a drama. When all the other actresses turned down the role, 21-year-old Julia Roberts, a relative unknown, with only the sleeper hit Mystic Pizza (1988) and the yet-to-be-released Steel Magnolias (1989), for which she would be nominated for the Academy Award for Best Supporting Actress, won the role of Vivian. Her performance made her a star. J.F.Lawton, writer of the original screenplay, has suggested that the film was ultimately given a happy ending because of the chemistry of Gere and Roberts.

Veteran actor Ralph Bellamy, who plays James Morse, appears in his final acting performance before his death in 1991. Jason Alexander, who had also recently been cast for his role as the bumbling George Costanza in Seinfeld, was cast as Philip Stuckey. A VHS copy of Pretty Woman would appear in Seinfeld's apartment in later seasons of Seinfeld as a homage to Alexander's participation in the film.

Filming  
The film's budget was substantial, at  million, so producers could shoot in many locations. Most filming took place in Los Angeles, California, specifically in Beverly Hills, and inside soundstages at Walt Disney Studios in Burbank. The escargot restaurant the "Voltaire" was shot at the restaurant "Rex," now called "Cicada". Scenes set in the Beverly Wilshire Hotel lobby were shot at the Ambassador Hotel in Los Angeles. Filming commenced on July 24, 1989, but was immediately plagued by problems. These included Ferrari and Porsche declining the product placement opportunity for the car Edward drove, neither firm wishing to be associated with prostitutes. Lotus Cars saw the placement value and supplied a Silver  Esprit SE (which was later sold).

The shooting was a generally pleasant, easy-going experience, as the budget was broad and the shooting schedule was not tight. While shooting the scene where Vivian is lying down on the floor of Edward's penthouse, watching reruns of I Love Lucy, Garry Marshall had to tickle Roberts' feet (out of camera range) to get her to laugh. The scene in which Gere playfully snaps the lid of a jewelry case on her fingers was improvised, and her surprised laugh was genuine. The red dress Vivian wears to the opera has been listed among the most unforgettable dresses of all time.

During the scene in which Roberts sang a Prince song in the bathtub, slid down, and submerged her head under the bubbles; she emerged to find the crew had left except for the cameraman, who captured the moment on film. In the love scene, she was so stressed that a vein became noticeable on her forehead and had to be massaged by Marshall and Gere. She also developed a case of hives, and calamine lotion was used to soothe her skin until filming resumed. The filming was completed on November 30.

Shelley Michelle acted as body double for Roberts in risqué scenes and the film's publicity poster.

Reception

Box office  
It returned to number one at the US box office in its sixth weekend and was number one for three weeks. It was in the Top 10 movies in the US for 16 weeks. In Australia, it was number one for 12 weeks and was number one for nine consecutive weeks in the UK. It was the fourth highest-grossing film of the year in the United States and Canada and the third highest-grossing worldwide. The film was Disney's highest-grossing film ever, surpassing Three Men and a Baby, and remains Disney's highest-grossing R-rated release.

Critical response  
On review aggregator Rotten Tomatoes the film holds an approval rating of 65% based on 75 reviews, with an average rating of 6.10/10. The website's critical consensus states, "Pretty Woman may be a yuppie fantasy, but the film's slick comedy, soundtrack, and casting can overcome misgivings." On Metacritic, the film has a weighted average score of 51 out of 100, based on 18 critics, indicating "mixed or average reviews". Audiences polled by CinemaScore gave the film an average grade of "A" on an A+ to F scale.

Owen Gleiberman of Entertainment Weekly gave the film a "D", saying it "starts out as a neo-Pygmalion comedy" and with "its tough-hooker heroine, it can work as a feminist version of an upscale princess fantasy." Gleiberman also said it "pretends to be about how love transcends money," but "is really obsessed with status symbols." On its twentieth anniversary, Gleiberman wrote another article, saying that while he felt he was right, he would have given it a "B" today. Carina Chocano of The New York Times said the movie "wasn't a love story, it was a money story. Its logic depended on a disconnect between character and narrative, between image and meaning, between money and value, and that made it not cluelessly traditional but thoroughly postmodern."

Accolades  

 It ranks on No. 21 in AFI's 100 Years... 100 Passions.

Music 

The soundtrack features the songs (among others); 
 "Oh, Pretty Woman" by Roy Orbison, which inspired its title. In fact this music has been previously used in 1985 movie Weird Sciences when actress Kelly LeBrook passes buy teenagers in a mall* 
 Roxette's "It Must Have Been Love", originally released in December 1987, reached No. 1 on the Billboard Hot 100 in June 1990. The soundtrack also features 
 "King of Wishful Thinking" by Go West
 "Show Me Your Soul" by Red Hot Chili Peppers
 "No Explanation" by Peter Cetera
 "Wild Women Do" by Natalie Cole and 
 "Fallen" by Lauren Wood
The soundtrack has been certified triple platinum by the Recording Industry Association of America (RIAA).

The opera featured in the film is La Traviata, which also served as inspiration for its plot. The highly dramatic aria fragment that is repeated is the end of "Dammi tu forza!" ("Give me strength!"), from the opera.  Roberts sings the song "Kiss" by Prince while she is in the tub and Gere's character is on the phone. Background music is composed by James Newton Howard. The piano piece Gere's character plays in the hotel lobby was composed and performed by Gere. Entitled "He Sleeps/Love Theme", this piano composition is inspired by Bruce Springsteen's "Racing in the Street".               *It is strange that this matter has never been mention anywhere further more how comes that the movie picture Pretty Woman has never given credit to movie picture Weird Science five year earlier using this soundtrack for this same purpose?

Musical adaptation 

A stage musical adaptation of the film opened on Broadway on July 20, 2018, in previews, officially on August 16 at the Nederlander Theatre. This follows an out-of-town tryout at the Oriental Theatre in Chicago, which will run from March 13 to April 15, 2018. The musical has music and lyrics by Bryan Adams and Jim Vallance; the late Garry Marshall and J.F.Lawton wrote the book; and Jerry Mitchell is the director and choreographer. The Chicago and Broadway cast featured Samantha Barks, in her Broadway debut as Vivian and Steve Kazee as Edward. Barks finished her run as Vivian on July 21, 2019, and was replaced by Jillian Mueller the following evening, with Brennin Hunt, of Rent fame, assuming the role of Edward. Orfeh portrayed Kit, and Jason Danieley played Philip Stuckey. Eric Anderson portrayed the role of Mr. Thompson and Kingsley Leggs played the role of James Morse.

References

External links

 
 
 
 
 
 

Album chart usages for Australia
Album chart usages for Austria
Album chart usages for Canada
Album chart usages for Netherlands
Album chart usages for Germany4
Album chart usages for New Zealand
Album chart usages for Norway
Album chart usages for Sweden
Album chart usages for Switzerland
Album chart usages for Billboard200
Album chart usages for UKSoundtrack
1990 films
1990 romantic comedy films
1990s sex comedy films
American romantic comedy films
American sex comedy films
1990s English-language films
Films about the upper class
Films about businesspeople
Films about interclass romance
Films about prostitution in the United States
Films directed by Garry Marshall
Films featuring a Best Musical or Comedy Actress Golden Globe winning performance
Films scored by James Newton Howard
Films set in Beverly Hills, California
Films set in hotels
Films set in Los Angeles
Films shot in Los Angeles
Midlife crisis films
Touchstone Pictures films
Films produced by Arnon Milchan
1990s American films